The Mayapuri metro station is located on the Pink Line of the Delhi Metro.

As part of Phase III of Delhi Metro, Mayapuri station was opened on 14 March 2018.

The station

Station layout

Entry/Exit

Connections

Bus
Delhi Transport Corporation bus routes number 442, 448, 448A, 448CL, 479, 479CL, 529SPL, 567, 568, 569, 804A, 808, 849, 891, 911A, 984A, AC-479, TMS (-), TMS-Lajpat Nagar, TMS-PBagh serves the station from nearby Mayapuri Crossing (Ring Road) bus stop.

See also

Delhi
List of Delhi Metro stations
Transport in Delhi
Delhi Metro Rail Corporation
Delhi Suburban Railway
Inner Ring Road, Delhi
Delhi Monorail
Mayapuri
Delhi Transport Corporation
South Delhi
New Delhi
National Capital Region (India)
List of rapid transit systems
List of metro systems

References

External links

 Delhi Metro Rail Corporation Ltd. (Official site)
 Delhi Metro Annual Reports
 
 UrbanRail.Net – descriptions of all metro systems in the world, each with a schematic map showing all stations.

Delhi Metro stations
Railway stations in India opened in 2018
Railway stations in West Delhi district